Arthur William Lyne (21 July 1884 – 30 December 1971) was a British politician. He was Labour Member of Parliament (MP) for Burton from 1945 to 1950.

References

External links 
 

1884 births
1971 deaths
UK MPs 1945–1950
Labour Party (UK) MPs for English constituencies
National Union of Boot and Shoe Operatives-sponsored MPs
Place of birth missing